More or Less may refer to:

 More or Less (radio programme), a UK programme focusing on numbers and statistics
 More or Less (puzzle), an alternate name for the logic puzzle Futoshiki
 More or Less (pricing game), a pricing game on the game show The Price Is Right
 "More or Less", a song by Screaming Trees from Sweet Oblivion
 "More or Less", a song by Talib Kweli from Eardrum

See also
Approximation